A genet (pronounced  or ) is a member of the genus Genetta, which consists of 17 species of small African carnivorans. The common genet is the only genet present in Europe and occurs in the Iberian Peninsula, Italy and France.

Genet fossils from the Late Miocene and later have been found at sites in Ethiopia, Kenya and Morocco.

Classification
Genetta was named and described by Frédéric Cuvier in 1816. The number of species in the genus is controversial. The following were proposed as valid in 2005:

Extinct species
Genetta plesictoides - Late Pleistocene of Cyprus

Genetta species are estimated to have diverged at least  starting with the Hausa genet, followed by the giant genet .

Characteristics

Genets are slender cat-like animals with a long body, a long ringed tail, large ears, a pointed muzzle and partly retractile claws. Their fur is spotted, but melanistic genets have also been recorded. They have musk glands and anal sacs. They also have perineal glands.

All genet species have a dark stripe along the spine; they differ in fur color and spot pattern. They have large eyes with elliptical pupils; the iris is about the color of the fur. They can move their eyes within their sockets to a limited extent, and move their heads to focus on moving objects. Their pinnae have a fine layer of hair inside and outside. They can move the pinnae by about 80° from pointing forward to the side, and also from an erect position to pointing downwards. Their rhinarium is important for both sensing smell and touch.

Distribution and habitat
All genet species are indigenous to Africa. The common genet was introduced to southwestern Europe during historical times. It was brought from the Maghreb to the Mediterranean region as a semi-domestic animal about 1000 to 1500 years ago, and from there spread to southern France and Italy. In Africa, it inhabits wooded habitats north of the Sahara, in savanna zones south of the Sahara to southern Africa and along the coast of Arabia, Yemen and Oman.

The Cape genet is endemic to fynbos, grassland and coastal forests in South Africa.

The South African small-spotted genet lives in woodland savanna, grassland, thickets, dry vlei areas in Angola, Namibia, South Africa and Zambia.

The pardine genet lives in primary and secondary rainforests, gallery forests, moist woodlands, but also in plantations and suburban areas ranging from Senegal to the Volta River in Ghana.

The King genet is restricted to rainforest in the Congo Basin, Bioko Island, Ghana and Liberia.

The servaline genet lives in Central African lowland forests to high-altitude bamboo forest and coral rag thicket on Zanzibar.

The Angolan genet inhabits open miombo forest from Angola to central Tanzania.

The giant forest genet lives in rainforests of the Democratic Republic of the Congo and western Uganda.

The Hausa genet inhabits savannah and moist woodlands in West Africa.

G. letabae has been recorded in woodland savannah in Lesotho, Eswatini, Mozambique, Namibia and South Africa.

Johnston's genet inhabits dense rainforest in Upper Guinea.

The aquatic genet inhabits rainforests between the Congo River and the Rift Valley.

The crested servaline genet is endemic to Nigeria and Cameroon, where it inhabits scrub and primary deciduous forests.

Schouteden's genet inhabits rainforest, woodland savannah and savannah-forest mosaic in tropical Africa.

Bourlon's genet lives only in the Upper Guinean rainforests in West Africa.

Ecology and behavior

Genets are highly agile, have quick reflexes and exceptional climbing skills. They are the only viverrids able to stand on their hind legs. They walk, trot, run, climb up and down trees, and jump. They live on the ground, but also spend much of their time in trees. They are considered solitary, except during mating and when females have offspring.

They are omnivorous and opportunistically catch invertebrates and small vertebrates, but also feed on plants and fruit. Aquatic genets feed mainly on fish. Angolan genets are thought to feed on grasshoppers and other arthropods. Johnston's genet probably feeds mainly on insects.

In 2014, a camera trap in the Hluhluwe–Imfolozi Park captured a large spotted genet riding on the back of two different buffalo and a rhinoceros. This was the first time a genet was recorded hitch-hiking.

Females have up to five young in a litter. They rear their young alone.

Common genet females become sexually mature at the age of two years. Once copulation has occurred, the gestation period lasts for 10 to 11 weeks. They are diestrous and give birth twice a year, during spring and late summer to autumn. Captive common genets have been known to live up to 13 years. A male genet lived for 22.7 years in captivity.

Threats

Loss of habitat due to deforestation and conversion of land to agriculture is a major threat for the crested servaline genet and Johnston's genet. Both genet species are also hunted for meat and skins. They are listed as Vulnerable on the IUCN Red Lists. These are also major threats for Bourlon's genet, which is classified as Near Threatened.

The aquatic genet may be affected by hunting, but major threats have not yet been identified. It is listed as Near Threatened on the IUCN Red List.

The king genet and the Abyssinian genet are so poorly known that threats cannot be identified. Both are listed as Data Deficient on the IUCN Red Lists.

The remaining genet species are not considered threatened and are listed as Least Concern on the IUCN Red Lists.

Etymology
The etymological origin of the word 'genet' is uncertain; it might originate from the Greek prefix gen meaning bear and the New Latin suffix etta meaning "small". Or it may be a derivation of the Arabic name djarnet. The English word comes from Old French 'genete', which came from Spanish 'gineta'.

As pets

Pet genets are mostly common genets, rusty-spotted genets or Cape genets.

References

Further reading
 Virgos, E., Llorente, M., & Cortes, Y. (1999). "Geographical variation in genet (Genetta genetta L) diet: a literature review". Mammal Review 29(2): 117–126.
 Camps, D. (2011). "Resting site selection, characteristics and use by the common genet Genetta genetta (Linnaeus 1758)". Mammalia 75: 23–29. .

External links

 Animal Diversity Web: Genetta genetta
 African Wildlife Foundation: Genet

 
 
Taxa named by Georges Cuvier
Viverrids